Chandra Shekhar Ghosh, (born in August 8, 1960 at Bishalgarh in Tripura, India) is the Founder, MD & CEO of Bandhan Bank. He has been one of the foremost proponents of financial inclusion in India. He has more than 30 years of experience in the microfinance and development terrain.

Early life and education    
Ghosh's father, Late Haripada Ghosh, owned a sweet shop in Tripura. Even as a student, Ghosh supported his father at the shop. After completing his education, he joined BRAC, Bangladesh’s largest non-government organisation (NGO). After returning to India, Ghosh worked with several NGOs, before quitting his last job at the Village Welfare Society. He then established Bandhan-Konnagar, a not-for-profit organisation in West Bengal, which aimed to provide microfinance services to the marginalised, thereby driving financial inclusion.

Ghosh holds a Master’s degree in Statistics.

Career 

Ghosh started Bandhan-Konnagar in 2001. The NGO extended micro-credit to marginalised women to help them become entrepreneurs. In 2009, the microfinance portfolio of the NGO was transferred to the NBFC, which Bandhan had acquired in 2006. Gradually, the organisation expanded its operations to various states of the country. In 2010, Bandhan became the largest microfinance institution in India. 

In 2014, Bandhan received an in-principal approval from the Reserve Bank of India to set up a universal bank. The final licence was obtained in June 2015. Bandhan Bank started operations on August 23, 2015, with Ghosh as the MD & CEO. This is the first-ever instance of an Indian microfinance institution becoming a universal bank. Incidentally, Bandhan Bank is also the first bank to be set up in Eastern India since Independence.

Besides being the former Chairman of The Confederation of Indian Industry (CII), Eastern Region, and the former President of Bengal Chamber of Commerce & Industry (BCC&I), he is also associated with various other industry bodies.

Awards
 'Senior Ashoka Fellow' – social entrepreneurship award – in 2007 by Ashoka Foundation
'Entrepreneur with Social Impact' 2014 by Forbes India Leadership Awards
 ‘Entrepreneur of the Year’ 2014 by The Economic Times
CNN-IBN ‘Indian of the Year’ in 2016 in the Business category
‘Banker of the Year’ for 2018-19 by Business Standard

Personal life 
Ghosh’s wife, Nilima, is an entrepreneur. His son, Angshuman, is currently a management student in England.

References

Living people
1960 births
Businesspeople from Kolkata
University of Dhaka alumni
Bandhan Bank
People from Sipahijala district
Ashoka Fellows